Transamination is a chemical reaction that transfers an amino group to a ketoacid to form new amino acids. This pathway is responsible for the deamination of most amino acids. This is one of the major degradation pathways which convert essential amino acids to non-essential amino acids (amino acids that can be synthesized de novo by the organism).

Transamination in biochemistry is accomplished by enzymes called transaminases or aminotransferases. α-ketoglutarate acts as the predominant amino-group acceptor and produces glutamate as the new amino acid.

Aminoacid  + α-ketoglutarate ↔ α-keto acid  + glutamate

Glutamate's amino group, in turn, is transferred to oxaloacetate in a second transamination reaction yielding aspartate.

Glutamate  +  oxaloacetate  ↔  α-ketoglutarate + aspartate

Mechanism of action

Transamination catalyzed by aminotransferase occurs in two stages. In the first step, the α amino group of an amino acid is transferred to the enzyme, producing the corresponding α-keto acid and the aminated enzyme. During the second stage, the amino group is transferred to the keto acid acceptor, forming the amino acid product while regenerating the enzyme. The chirality of an amino acid is determined during transamination. For the reaction to complete, aminotransferases require participation of aldehyde containing coenzyme, pyridoxal-5'-phosphate (PLP), a derivative of Pyridoxine (Vitamin B6). The amino group is accommodated by conversion of this coenzyme to pyridoxamine-5'-phosphate (PMP). PLP is covalently attached to the enzyme via a Schiff Base linkage formed by the condensation of its aldehyde group with the ε-amino group of an enzymatic Lys residue. The Schiff base, which is conjugated to the enzyme's pyridinium ring, is the focus of the coenzyme activity.

The product of transamination reactions depend on the availability of α-keto acids. The products usually are either alanine, aspartate or glutamate, since their corresponding alpha-keto acids are produced through metabolism of fuels. Being a major degradative aminoacid pathway, lysine, proline and threonine are the only three amino acids that do not always undergo transamination and rather use respective dehydrogenase.
Alternative Mechanism
A second type of transamination reaction can be described as a nucleophilic substitution of one amine or amide anion on an amine or ammonium salt. For example, the attack of a primary amine by a primary amide anion can be used to prepare secondary amines:  
RNH2 + R'NH− → RR'NH + NH2−  
Symmetric secondary amines can be prepared using Raney nickel (2RNH2 → R2NH + NH3). And finally, quaternary ammonium salts can be dealkylated using ethanolamine: 
R4N+ + NH2CH2CH2OH → R3N + RN+H2CH2CH2OH  
Aminonaphthalenes also undergo transaminations.[2]

Types of aminotransferase

Transamination is mediated by several types of aminotransferase enzymes. An aminotransferase may be specific for an individual amino acid, or it may be able to process any member of a group of similar ones, for example the branched-chain amino acids, which comprises valine, isoleucine, and leucine. The  two common types of aminotransferases are alanine aminotransferase (ALT) and aspartate aminotransferase (AST).

References

•  Smith, M. B. and March, J. Advanced Organic Chemistry: Reactions, Mechanisms, and Structure, 5th ed. Wiley, 2001, p. 503.  
•  Gerald Booth "Naphthalene Derivatives" in Ullmann's Encyclopedia of Industrial Chemistry, 2005, Wiley-VCH, Weinheim. doi:10.1002/14356007.a17_009

Voet & Voet. "Biochemistry" Fourth edition

External links
 Amino Acid Biosynthesis  
 The chemical logic behind aminoacid degradation and the urea cycle

Organic reactions
Amino acids